Innovation Credit Union is a Canadian credit union. It was formed on January 1, 2007, through the merger of Southwest Credit Union and BCU Financial (previously Battlefords Credit Union). Innovation is the third largest credit union in Saskatchewan and the 21st largest credit union in Canada. All deposits are insured by the Saskatchewan Credit Union Deposit Guarantee Corporation.

History
When Pioneer Credit Union and Western Credit Union merged, they re-branded to Southwest Credit Union in 1993.  Southwest Credit Union and BCU Financial merged January 1, 2007 to form Innovation Credit Union. This was the first financial institution in Canada to pilot Point of sale. The pilot took place in Swift Current, Saskatchewan in 1985, and involved the installation of point of sale systems at 28 Pioneer Co-op outlets.

Innovation is the 21st largest credit union in Canada, and the third largest credit union in Saskatchewan. The credit union has over 55,000 member owners and total assets under administration of over $2.4 billion. Its services include banking, wealth management, credit products and services through 24 advice centres.

Advice Centre locations
Innovation Credit Union refers to its physical locations as Advice Centres. Innovation has Advice Centres in the Saskatchewan communities of Buffalo Narrows, Goodsoil, Pierceland, Meadow Lake, Shell Lake, Leoville, Glaslyn, Meota, Medstead, Hafford, North Battleford, Battleford, Cut Knife, Wilke, Swift Current, Gull Lake, Cabri, Hodgeville, Gravelbourg, Frontier, Eastend, Lancer, Ponteix, and Mankota. The Credit Union also had an administration office in Regina, and mobile advisors in Regina, SK and Saskatoon, SK.

Federal Credit Union
In October 2017, Innovation Credit Union provided notice of its intent to apply to become a federal credit union. The following December, Innovation Credit Union members voted in favor of a proposal to become the first federal credit union headquartered in Saskatchewan. Of 17,214 members who voted, 82% voted in favor of the Special Resolution. This will make Innovation Credit Union the third federally-regulated credit union in Canada, with UNI Financial Cooperation being the first, and Coast Capital Savings being the second.

Naming rights and sponsorships 
The credit union holds the naming rights to the Innovation Credit Union iPlex in Swift Current, a multi-purpose recreation facility mainly used for ice skating and curling. The facility is used by Western Hockey League's Swift Current Broncos.

North Battleford's Credit Union CUplex, opened in 2013, is named for the credit union which donated $1.5 million for lifetime naming rights. The overall facility includes four-components: the Dekker Centre for the Performing Arts, the Northland Power Curling Centre, the NATIONSWEST Field House, and the Battlefords CO-OP Aquatic Centre.

As of 2019, Innovation has donated over $6.42 million to the communities it operates in.

In 2018, Innovation donated $100,000 to the new Saskatchewan Hospital. In recognition of this donation, the patient business centre will be named in honour of Innovation Credit Union.

Recognition
Innovation Credit Union was recognized as one of Canada's top 100 employers through the Annual Saskatchewan's Top Employers competition in 2018, 2017, 2016, and 2015.

In 2017, ICU won two Achievement in Marketing Excellence (AIME) Awards, one of which was for creating the first mobile branch of any credit union in Canada. The mobile branch serves small communities without financial institutions especially in the Northern part of the Province. Since then, Innovation has added a second mobile unit.

In 2018, Innovation Credit Union was recognized as an Employee Recommended Workplace by The Globe and Mail and Morneau Sheppel.

Supreme Court of Canada case
The credit union was party to the 2010 Bank of Montreal v Innovation Credit Union case.

See also
 Credit unions in Canada
 History of credit unions
 List of banks and credit unions in Canada

References

2007 establishments in Saskatchewan
Credit unions of Saskatchewan
Companies based in Saskatchewan
Swift Current